Gesneria rindgeorum is a species of moth in the family Crambidae described by Eugene G. Munroe in 1972. It is found in the US states of Utah, Wyoming, Montana and Washington.

References

Moths described in 1972
Scopariinae